Loropéni is a market town in southern Burkina Faso, lying about  west of Gaoua. Nearby are the medieval stone ruins of Loropéni, added to the UNESCO World Heritage List in 2009. These ruins of a fortress, which date back at least a thousand years, are the country's first World Heritage site.

References

Populated places in the Sud-Ouest Region (Burkina Faso)
Mining communities in Africa
Mining in Burkina Faso